Oliver M.  Wozencraft (July 26, 1814 – November 22, 1887) was a prominent early American settler in California.  He had substantial involvement in negotiating treaties between California Native American Indian tribes and the United States of America.  Later, Wozencraft promoted a plan to provide irrigation to the Imperial Valley.

Life

Early years
Wozencraft was born in Clermont County, Ohio, June 26, 1814.
He graduated with a degree in medicine from St. Joseph's College in Bardstown, Kentucky.  Wozencraft married Lamiza A. Ramsey (June 13, 1818 – August 30, 1905) in Nashville, Tennessee on February 23, 1837.  In 1848, leaving his wife and three small children in New Orleans directly after a cholera epidemic, he relocated to Brownsville, Texas.

After the cholera epidemic swept Brownsville in February through April 1849, upon hearing news of gold being discovered, Wozencraft decided to seek his fortune in California.  Wozencraft arrived at Yuma, Arizona in May 1849, crossed the Colorado Desert in difficult circumstances, then arrived in California.

California Constitutional Convention
Wozencraft settled in Stockton, California and was elected as delegate to the California Constitutional Convention in Monterey in 1849 representing the district of San Joaquin.

Wozencraft spoke against the admission of African Americans to California:

He also moved that a two term limit apply to the position of Governor of California.  That question was debated then rejected.

Wozencraft's signature appears on the handwritten parchment copy of the constitution signed by the delegates on October 13, 1849.

Treaties with Native Americans

On July 8, 1850, President Millard Fillmore appointed Wozencraft as an Indian Agent of the United States.  Salary and expenses were not provided to Wozencraft for this appointment.  On October 15, 1850 his title as Indian Agent was suspended and he, Redick McKee and George W. Barbour were appointed "commissioners 'to hold treaties with various Indian tribes in the State of California,' as provided in the act of Congress approved September 30, 1850."  In that role Wozencraft was paid eight dollars per day plus ten cents per mile travelled.

Between March 19, 1851 and January 7, 1852 Wozencraft, McKee and Barbour traversed California and negotiated 18 treaties with Native American tribes.  The treaties were submitted to the United States Senate on June 1, 1852.  They were considered and rejected for ratification by the Senate in closed session. The treaties were then sealed from public record until January 18, 1905.

Fillmore removed Wozencraft's standing as an Indian Agent on August 28, 1852.

Imperial Valley Irrigation
Wozencraft was an advocate for creating a gravity-fed canal from the Colorado River to provide irrigation to the Salton Sink area of the Colorado Desert (now known as the Imperial Valley). Around 1854 to 1855 he hired Ebenezer Hadley, County Surveyor of Los Angeles and Deputy County Surveyor of San Bernardino, to survey a route for the canal. In 1859 Wozencraft successfully lobbied the California State Legislature to provisionally allocate  of the Colorado Desert to himself for the scheme.

Wozencraft required passage of federal legislation (e.g. H.R.3219) to finalize the land allocation approved by the state legislature.  This would allow him to secure capital to complete the project.  He unsuccessfully lobbied the United States Congress for this allocation for the remainder of his life.

Death and legacy

Wozencraft died of a heart attack on November 22, 1887 in a boardinghouse in Washington, D.C.  He had been in Washington to again present a Colorado Desert irrigation scheme bill to Congress.  Just prior to his death the bill had been killed in committee.  In committee the bill was described as a "fantastic folly of an old man".

Work began on the Alamo Canal 13 years after Wozencraft's death, ultimately providing irrigation to the Imperial Valley in a manner similar to that first proposed by Wozencraft almost 50 years earlier.  He has been declared the "Father of the Imperial Valley."

Modern evaluations of the treaties he negotiated with California Native Americans are critical:

Nineteenth century evaluations are likewise scathing:

Wozencraft is buried at the San Bernardino Pioneer Memorial Cemetery.

References

Further reading
 
 Wozencraft letter to Hon. Luke Lea, Commissioner Indian Affairs, Washington requesting $500,000 to cover treaty commitments to California Native Americans. 
 Wozencraft accused of demanding kickback from contract to supply cattle to Native American bands as part of treaty negotiations. 
 Magazine article with Wozencraft claims of finding baby Shasta abandoned by mother; picture of Shasta in 1882. 
 Gunfight with Willis brothers.  Willis accuses Wozencraft of being drunk, abusive and the first to draw a pistol. 
 1864 newspaper article by Mark Twain describing Wozencraft's oration in praise of the Democratic Party and Secession; "His speech was simply a rehash of all the whinings and hypocrisy of Copperheads since the conflict began."

External links

19th-century colonization of the Americas
Physicians from Ohio
Colorado Desert
History of San Bernardino, California
Imperial Valley
Native American history of California
California pioneers
United States Indian agents
1814 births
1887 deaths
People from Clermont County, Ohio